Jazimaq (also Romanized as Jazīmaq; also known as Jazīman (Persian: جزيمن), Gizmeh, Kharīmaq, and Kiz’ma) is a village in Qareh Poshtelu-e Pain Rural District, Qareh Poshtelu District, Zanjan County, Zanjan Province, Iran. At the 2006 census, its population was 250, in 51 families.

References 

Populated places in Zanjan County